Erythros Stavros, meaning "Red Cross", is a neighborhood of Athens, located between the districts of Ambelokipoi, Ellinoroson and Girokomeio. It was named after the Erythros Stavros Hospital, which is located in the center. It is also considered part of the Ambelokipi neighborhood. Apart from the hospital, this district is home to the Police School and the Ministry of Justice, Transparency and Human Rights. It is serviced by the Line 3 of Athens Metro and a plurality of bus lines.

References

Neighbourhoods in Athens